Vlasivka is an urban-type settlement in Oleksandriia Raion of Kirovohrad Oblast in Ukraine. It is located on the left bank of the Dnieper next to the Kremenchuk Hydroelectric Power Plant and close to the city of Kremenchuk. This is the only locality in Kirovohrad Oblast on the left bank of the Dnieper. Vlasivka belongs to Svitlovodsk urban hromada, one of the hromadas of Ukraine. Population: 

Until 18 July 2020, Vlasivka belonged to Svitlovodsk Municipality. The municipality was abolished as an administrative unit in July 2020 as part of the administrative reform of Ukraine, which reduced the number of raions of Kirovohrad Oblast to four. The area of Svitlovodsk Municipality was merged into Oleksandriia Raion.

Economy

Transportation
Livoberezhna Railway Station is in Vlasivka. This is a terminal station which is connected to Kremenchuk, however, there is no passenger navigation. The closes station with passenger navigation is Nedoharky, where there are infrequent passenger connections with Svitlovodsk across the hydropower plant dam. In Kremenchuk, there is frequent passenger traffic.

The settlement is connected by road with Kremenchuk and, over the dam, with Svitlovodsk.

People from Vlasivka 
 Serhiy Bilous (born 1999), Ukrainian footballer

References

Urban-type settlements in Oleksandriia Raion
Populated places on the Dnieper in Ukraine